Kelesh Ahmed-Bey (Kelesh-Bey) Chachba (Shervashidze) (1747–1808) was the head of state of the Principality of Abkhazia from the 1780s to 1808. Kelesh-Bey was the son of Manuchar Chachba-Shervashidze.

Biography
Kelesh-Bey was born in 1747 in the Principality of Abkhazia. In his childhood, Kelesh-Bey was taken to Istanbul, Turkey as a hostage, where he converted to Islam.  Kelesh returned to Abkhazia from Istanbul in the 1770s with the goal of taking over and ruling his native land. With the help of Turkish forces, Kelesh-Bey was able to overthrow his uncle, Zurab Shervashidze, and take over the Abkhaz crown. Kelesh-Bey was known for his energetic drive to consolidate state power while actively fighting against the Principality of Mingrelia which bordered Abkhazia to the east. Kelesh-Bey was the grand father of Gülüstü Hanım, Sultan Abdulmejid I's consort and Sultan Mehmed VI's mother. 

In 1802, he rallied the Turkish support and captured the Mingrelian fort of Anaklia. After Mingrelia joined the Russian Empire in 1803, Kelesh also tried to seek closer ties (associated relations) with Russia, which led to Abkhazia’s break with Ottoman Turkey.  Becoming increasingly worried about Abkhazia drifting closer to Russia, the Turkish leadership tried to remove Kelesh-Bey from power by force, but failed. In the end, Turkey was able to remove Kelesh from the Abkhaz throne by forging close ties to his son Aslan-Bey who killed his father and became the new ruler of Abkhazia. George Hewitt considers this a Russian fabrication and accuses Aslan-bey's brother Sefer-Bey, Nino Dadiani and the Russian military administration of the assassination.

Children
Aslan-Bey Shervashidze
Sefer Ali-Bey Shervashidze
Batal Bey Shervashidze
Hasan Bey Shervashidze 
Tatar Bey Shervashidze 
Rustam Bey Shervashidze 
Sulaiman Bey Shervashidze 
Mahmud Bey Shervashidze 
Sekir Bey Shervashidze 
Rustam Khanum

References
 Georgian State (Soviet) Encyclopedia. 1983. Book 10. p. 689.

1747 births
1806 deaths
Converts to Islam from Eastern Orthodoxy
Former Georgian Orthodox Christians
Princes of Abkhazia
Kelesh Ahmed-Bey